Cari Dominguez (born 10 October 1992) is a Dominican handball player for Maquiteria Handball and the Dominican Republic national team.

References

1992 births
Living people
Dominican Republic female handball players
Pan American Games medalists in handball
Pan American Games bronze medalists for the Dominican Republic
Handball players at the 2011 Pan American Games
Central American and Caribbean Games gold medalists for the Dominican Republic
Competitors at the 2010 Central American and Caribbean Games
Competitors at the 2018 Central American and Caribbean Games
Handball players at the 2019 Pan American Games
Central American and Caribbean Games medalists in handball
Medalists at the 2011 Pan American Games
21st-century Dominican Republic women